"I'll Never Break Your Heart" is a song by American boy band Backstreet Boys. The song was written by singer-songwriters Eugene Wilde and Albert Manno and produced by Veit Renn and Timmy Allen. It was released in the United Kingdom on December 4, 1995, as the second single from their self-titled debut album and was issued across the rest of Europe later the same month. It was later included on their US debut album and was released as their fourth US single in June 1998.

Background
The song replaced "I'll Never Find Someone Like You" on the album, which was to be the group's first single. The group's label, Jive Records, had not committed to using the song for the group, and as a result, it was offered to singer Keith Martin, who accepted it and released it as a single on the Bad Boys soundtrack, and his own albums It's Long Overdue and All the Hits. Brian Littrell discovered this when he heard Martin's song play on the radio one day.

"I'll Never Break Your Heart" was supposedly recorded over two weeks, because Littrell and AJ McLean, the two lead vocalists on the song, had colds. In an interview with Billboard, McLean stated that the song "was the longest recording for any single BSB record in Backstreet history", as they had to manually rewind the tape in order to add brand new vocals in the track while they were sick.

In October 2014, the group took ownership of the master recording of the song as part of a settlement agreement with their ex-manager, Lou Pearlman's bankruptcy estate.

Critical reception
Pan-European magazine Music & Media wrote that "with the up-tempo, infectious 'We've Got It Goin' On' still in the Benelux, German and Swiss top 10, the Backstreet Boys slowed their crystal clear vocals down to make one of those smooth R&B ballads which are typically aimed for the US market." A reviewer from Music Week rated it four out of five, adding, "The soppiness factor is in to full effect on this romantic ballad, which displays the boys' vocal excellence. A November tour will help this become another top five hit." Chuck Arnold from People Magazine said that Backstreet Boys gave their "smoothest Boyz II Men impression" on this R&B ballad, adding that "they make you believe every word of their vow to do no harm."

Commercial performance
The song was first released in the United Kingdom and Europe in December 1995, then in 1996 for a few other markets, including a UK re-issue in November. It was subsequently serviced to US radio in June 1998. Following a physical released on July 21, 1998, the song peaked at number 35 on the Billboard Hot 100. It fared better on the Adult Contemporary chart, where it became the group's first number-one song on this ranking. Outside the US, the song peaked at number eight on the UK Singles Chart and also reached the top 10 in Australia, Germany, the Netherlands, Sweden, and Switzerland.

Music videos
Two music videos were released for "I'll Never Break Your Heart".

Original version
The accompanying music video follows a group of girls, one of whom has recently broken up with her boyfriend, as stated in the video's introduction. The band members are on a ski vacation, and each partners up with one of the girls. Brian Littrell gets together with the girl who had just broken up with her boyfriend. The girl Kevin Richardson is matched with was his then-girlfriend and now-wife Kristin Willits, as she was asked by the director to be featured in the video as an extra. The group had not skied before or seen snow, and would constantly fall off after the cameras stopped rolling. This original video was filmed in November 1995 in Snowbird, Utah. It first aired in December 1995 in Germany, France, and other nations in Western Europe.

Alternate version
The second video, directed by Bille Woodruff, was released to MTV in June 1998 for the US market. It later appeared as the first video on Total Request Live. The video features each band member singing in their own uniquely styled apartment which are stacked atop one another in a tall building. Late in the video, each of the members is shown to have a girl in their apartment. The group is also shown singing together in a cylindrical tunnel which has a rotating round porthole at the near end, though which the camera observes. A version of the video was also released for the Spanish version of the song.

The dog in Littrell's apartment was actually his dog, and the lady in his apartment was his then-girlfriend, now-wife Leighanne Wallace. Numerous teen magazines speculated that Nick Carter and his "girlfriend" in the video were engaged.  In reality, Carter's girlfriend in the video was portrayed by 16-year-old actress, Jessica Mion, who had never met any of the Backstreet Boys until the filming of the video, and never met with them since.

This video version was published on YouTube in April 2011. It has amassed more than 59 million views as of September 2021.

Other versions
The Spanish version of the song, titled "Nunca Te Haré Llorar", was later recorded in Zürich along with a Spanish version of "Anywhere for You". The idea came after they had started gaining success in Spanish countries such as Mexico and Spain. The label suggested they created Spanish versions to dedicate to those countries. Andy Williams released a version in 2007 on his album, I Don't Remember Ever Growing Up. The video for the Spanish version was shot directly after the English video for the US market.

Track listings

United Kingdom
Original
 "I'll Never Break Your Heart" (Radio Edit) - 4:25
 "I'll Never Break Your Heart" (LP Version) - 4:49
 "Roll with It" [alternate version] - 4:43

Re-release CD1
 "I'll Never Break Your Heart" (Radio Edit) - 4:25
 "We've Got It Goin' On" (Amadin's Club Mix) - 6:33
 "Mark Goodier Interview" (Part 1)

Re-release CD2
 "I'll Never Break Your Heart" (Radio Edit) - 4:25
 "Roll with It" - 4:43
 "Mark Goodier Interview" (Part 2)

Cassette
 "I'll Never Break Your Heart" (Radio Edit) - 4:25
 "Roll with It" - 4:43

United States
CD
 "I'll Never Break Your Heart" (radio edit) - 4:25
 "I'll Never Break Your Heart" (LP version) - 4:49
 "I'll Never Break Your Heart" (Spanglish version) - 4:48
 "Nunca Te Hare Llorar (I'll Never Break Your Heart)" (Spanish version) - 4:44
 "I'll Never Break Your Heart" (instrumental) - 4:25

Credits and personnel
 Produced by Veit Renn and Timmy Allen
 All Instruments by Veit Renn and Timmy Allen
 Mixed by Chris Trevett at Battery Studios
 Recorded by Joe Smith at Parc Studios and Platinum Post Studios, Orlando

Charts

Weekly charts

Year-end charts

Release history

References

1995 songs
1995 singles
1996 singles
Andy Williams songs
Backstreet Boys songs
Contemporary R&B ballads
Jive Records singles
Music videos directed by Bille Woodruff
Songs written by Eugene Wilde
1990s ballads